Groton Wood is a  biological Site of Special Scientific Interest north-east of Groton in Suffolk. It is owned and managed by the Suffolk Wildlife Trust.

Fifteen species of butterfly have been recorded in this wood, including brimstones, speckled woods and purple hairstreaks. There are many wild cherry trees, and twenty-two seasonal ponds, which have scarce and protected great crested newts.

There is access from Howe Road.

References

Suffolk Wildlife Trust
Sites of Special Scientific Interest in Suffolk
Babergh District